The Spanish Small Temple also Cahal Cicu synagogue also Templul mic spaniol „Ca’al Cicu”, built in 1846 was located on 37 Banu Maracine Street in Bucharest, Romania.

History 
The building was devastated by the far-right Legionaries in 1941.The synagogue was rebuilt after the war. However, in 1986 the building was demolished to make room for the Union Boulevard in Bucharest.

See also
 History of the Jews in Romania.
 List of synagogues in Romania.
 List of synagogues in Bucharest.

References 

Synagogues completed in 1846
1846 establishments in the Russian Empire
Buildings and structures demolished in 1941
1986 disestablishments in the Soviet Union
Buildings and structures demolished in 1986
Synagogues in Bucharest
Demolished buildings and structures in Bucharest
Sephardi synagogues
Sephardi Jewish culture in Romania
Destroyed synagogues
Spanish-Jewish diaspora in Europe